Senator Shepard may refer to:

Mark Shepard (born 1960), Vermont State Senate
Seth Shepard (1847–1917), Texas State Senate
William Biddle Shepard (1799–1852), North Carolina State Senate
Abraham Shepherd (1776–1847), Ohio State Senate
Derrick Shepherd (born 1970), Louisiana State Senate

See also
Morris Sheppard (1875–1941), U.S. Senator from Texas
Oscar Sheppard (1845–1922), Ohio State Senate